Claude Feemster Clayton (August 4, 1909 – July 4, 1969) was a United States circuit judge of the United States Court of Appeals for the Fifth Circuit and previously was a United States district judge of the United States District Court for the Northern District of Mississippi.

Education and career
Born in Tupelo, Mississippi, Clayton received a Bachelor of Laws from the University of Mississippi School of Law in 1931. He was in private practice in Tupelo from 1931 to 1935, and was a prosecuting attorney for Lee County, Mississippi, from 1935 to 1938. He was a Circuit Judge of the First Circuit Court District of Mississippi from 1938 to 1942. After serving in the United States Army, he was in private practice in Tupelo from 1945 to 1958. He was the Tupelo city attorney from 1949 to 1953.

Army
He served in the Army from 1942 to 1945 and 30 years in the Mississippi National Guard. He was commander of the 31st Infantry Division and retired as a major general.

Federal judicial service

On February 24, 1958, Clayton was nominated by President Dwight D. Eisenhower to a seat on the United States District Court for the Northern District of Mississippi vacated by Judge Elijah Allen Cox. Clayton was confirmed by the United States Senate on March 4, 1958, and received his commission on March 12, 1958. He served as Chief Judge from 1966 to 1967. Clayton's service was terminated on November 23, 1967, due to elevation to the Fifth Circuit.

On October 16, 1967, President Lyndon B. Johnson nominated Clayton to a new seat on the United States Court of Appeals for the Fifth Circuit created by 80 Stat. 75. He was confirmed by the Senate on October 26, 1967, and received his commission the following day. He served until his death on July 4, 1969.

References

Sources
 

1909 births
1969 deaths
Judges of the United States District Court for the Northern District of Mississippi
United States district court judges appointed by Dwight D. Eisenhower
Judges of the United States Court of Appeals for the Fifth Circuit
United States court of appeals judges appointed by Lyndon B. Johnson
20th-century American judges
University of Mississippi alumni
National Guard (United States) generals
20th-century American lawyers
Mississippi National Guard personnel